Pam Faris (born February 15, 1957) is a former American politician from Michigan. Faris is a former Democratic member of Michigan House of Representatives for District 48 and a former Second Lady of Michigan.

Early life 
On February 15, 1957, Faris was born in Flint, Michigan. In 1975, Faris graduated from Powers Catholic High School in Flint, Michigan.

Education 
Faris earned an honorary associate degree from Mott Community College in Flint, Michigan. Faris earned a bachelor's degree in business administration-human resources from Baker College in Flint, Michigan.

Career 
Faris started her career at General Motors at Fisher Body. Faris was a case coordinator and a jury coordinator with the Genesee Circuit Court system. In 2003, Faris retired as a jury coordinator.

In 2008, Faris became the CEO of the MDP-MI Blue Tiger until 2009.

In 2010, Faris was appointed to become a member of the board of trustees for Mott Community College.

On November 6, 2012, Faris won the election and became a Democratic member of the Michigan House of Representatives for District 48. Faris defeated Jeffrey Woolman with 63.77% of the votes. On November 4, 2014, as an incumbent, Faris won the election and continued serving District 48. Faris defeated Stephanie K. Stikovich with 62.33% of the votes. On November 8, 2016, as an incumber, Far is won the election and continued serving District 48. Far is defeated Joseph Reno with 53.82% of the vote.

Awards 
 2019 Outstanding Alum Award. Presented by Mott Community College.

Personal life 
Faris' husband is John D. Cherry Jr., a former lieutenant governor. They have two children, Meghan and John Cherry III. Faris and her family live in Clio, Michigan.
Faris' sister-in-law is Deborah Cherry, a politician in Michigan.

See also 
 2012 Michigan House of Representatives election
 2014 Michigan House of Representatives election
 2016 Michigan House of Representatives election

References

External links
 Pam Faris at ballotpedia.org 
 Michigan House Democrats Profile
 Pam Faris at ourcampaigns.com
Legislative website
 2012 Genesee County Polls at mlive.com

Living people
1957 births
Democratic Party members of the Michigan House of Representatives
Women state legislators in Michigan
21st-century American politicians
21st-century American women politicians
People from Flint, Michigan
People from Clio, Michigan